The Mazda RX-Vision is a concept sports car produced by the Japanese car manufacturer Mazda, presented in 2015.

Presentation

The RX-Vision was presented at the Tokyo Motor Show in October 2015. A racing version of the car, the Mazda RX-Vision GT3 Concept, was announced at the 2019 FIA Gran Turismo Championship World Finals. Designed for the Group GT3 regulations and for the Gran Turismo Sport video game, the car became available on the game in May 2020.

Specifications
The RX-Vision uses Skyactiv-R technology, which guarantees reliability and low fuel consumption by reducing the weight of the parts. At the design level, the KODO philosophy (the soul of movement) has been applied. Although it is not specified how many rotors the original concept car has, the RX-Vision GT3 Concept is stated to use a four-rotor engine.

Awards
The Mazda RX-Vision concept was voted "Most Beautiful Concept Car" at the International Automobile Festival in Paris in 2016.

References

External links 

Cars introduced in 2015
Coupés
Cars powered by Wankel engines
RX-Vision
Rear-wheel-drive vehicles